Schoenorchis micrantha, commonly known as the tangled flea orchid, is a small epiphytic orchid that forms small, tangled clumps and has thin stems, many linear leaves and up to thirty small, white, bell-shaped flowers. It is found from Indochina to the south-west Pacific.

Description
Schoenorchis micrantha is a small epiphytic herb that forms small, tangled clumps. The side lobes are short and erect and the middle lobe is short with a short spur. Flowering occurs between April and July.

Taxonomy and naming
Schoenorchis micrantha was first formally described in 1825 by Carl Ludwig Blume from an unpublished description by Caspar Reinwardt and the description was published in Bijdragen tot de flora van Nederlandsch Indië. The specific epithet (micrantha) is derived from the Ancient Greek words mikros meaning "small" or "little" and anthos meaning "flower".

Distribution and habitat
The tangled flea orchid grows on mangroves and rainforest trees in humid, well lit places. It is found in Thailand, Vietnam, Borneo, Java, the Lesser Sunda Islands, Peninsular Malaysia, the Philippines, Sumatra, New Guinea, the Solomon Islands, Queensland, Fiji, New Caledonia, Samoa and Vanuatu. In Queensland it is found between the Iron Range and the Tully River.

References

Orchids of New Guinea
Orchids of Queensland
Plants described in 1825
Aeridinae